Palirisa is a genus of moths of the family Eupterotidae erected by Frederic Moore in 1884.

Species
Palirisa archivicina Bryk, 1944
Palirisa cervina Moore, 1865
Palirisa lineosa (Walker, 1855)
Palirisa rotundala Mell, 1929
Palirisa salex Pugaev & T.T. Du, 2011
Palirisa sinensis Rothschild, 1917
Palirisa taipeishanis Mell, 1937

References

Pugaev, S. N. & Du, T. T. (2011). "Palirisa salex sp. nov., a new species from Vietnam (Lepidoptera: Eupterotidae)". Tinea. 21 (4): 203–213.

Eupterotinae